Neocollyris thomsoni is a species of ground beetle in the genus Neocollyris in the family Carabidae. It was described by Horn in 1894.

References

Thomsoni, Neocollyris
Beetles described in 1894